Lagarde is a French surname. Notable people with the surname include:

 Alfred Lagarde (1948–1998), Dutch voice actor
 Charles Lagarde (1878–?), French Olympic athlete
 Christine Lagarde (born 1956), French politician, current President of the European Central Bank and former Managing Director of the IMF
 Claude Lagarde (1895–?), French Olympic shooter
 Claude François Chauveau-Lagarde (1756–1841), French lawyer and political figure
 Jean-Christophe Lagarde (born 1967), French political figure
 Jocelyne LaGarde (1924–1979), Tahiti-born Hawaiian personality, noted for appearance in 1966 film Hawaii
 Karloff Lagarde (1928–2007), Mexican athlete in professional wrestling
 Karloff Lagarde, Jr. (born 1970), Mexican athlete in professional wrestling
 Léonce Lagarde (1860–1936), French political figure
 Maurice L. Lagarde (f. 2000s), US businessman
 Maxime Lagarde (born 1994), French chess grandmaster
 Paul Lagarde (1891–?), French Olympic pole vaulter
 Paul de Lagarde (1827–1891), German scientist and academician
 Tom LaGarde (born 1955), American basketball player

French-language surnames